Chancellor is a political title.

The Chancellor may also refer to:
Robert R. Livingston (1746–1813), American lawyer, politician, diplomat and founding father 
The Survivors of the Chancellor, 1875 novel written by Jules Verne

See also
 Chancellor (disambiguation)
 The Chancellor Manuscript, 1977 novel by Robert Ludlum
 The Emperor (disambiguation)